Gabriel Fino Noriega (born 1966/7- died 2009) was a Honduran journalist and radio presenter who presented a daily news show on Radio Estelar. He also worked for Radio America (Honduras). He was shot dead on July 3, 2009 in San Juan Pueblo, near La Ceiba in the early days of the 2009 Honduran constitutional crisis. Noriega was in favour of a constituent assembly and opposed to the 2009 coup d'état. Local human rights organisation COFADEH attributed the assassination to the coup d'état, while an international human rights mission judged this claim to be a useful line of research.

Career and points of view

Gabriel Fino Noriega expressed opinions in favour of the 4th ballot box Constitutional assembly and against the removal of Manuel Zelaya Rosales on June 28, 2009. Sectors of society were divided over the actions on June 28 and he sympathized with the Resistance that called the removal a coup and other factors of society including the governmental branches said that it was a constitutional destitution from the presidency.

Death
Gabriel Fino Noriega was killed by 7 bullets on 3 July when he left his workplace. The local human rights organisation COFADEH attributes the assassination to the coup d'état. An international human rights mission considered Noriega's political points of view to offer a line of research for understanding the death, but insufficient proof that the reason for the killing was political. Radio America, his employer and police both discarded politics as a motive for his death and related his murder to personal enemies.

References

External links
 photograph of Gabriel Fino Noriega

Assassinated Honduran journalists
Year of birth uncertain
2009 deaths
1960s births